Lucy Brooks may refer to:

 Lucy Ann Brooks (1835–1926), English temperance advocate
 Lucy Goode Brooks (1818–1900), American slave who was instrumental in the founding of the Friends' Asylum for Colored Friends' Asylum for Colored Orphans in Richmond, Virginia